Lestes virgatus is a species of damselfly in the family Lestidae, the spreadwings. It is known commonly as the smoky spreadwing and virginal spreadwing. It is native to much of southeastern Africa, where it is widespread. It lives in pools and swamps in forest and woodland habitat.

References

External links

 Lestes virgatus on African Dragonflies and Damselflies Online

V
Odonata of Africa
Insects described in 1839
Taxonomy articles created by Polbot